The 1985 1. divisjon (women), was the second season of a top-tier women's football league in Norway, and was won by Nymark. The league was contested by 30 teams, divided in three groups of 10 teams.

In each group, the teams met each other twice in a round-robin, with 2 points given for wins, and 1 point for a draw. At the end of the season, the three group-winners met in a playoff to determine the championship, while the bottom two team from each group was relegated (three teams from the Group Vestlandet).

Nymark won the championship playoff, while Asker finished second and Trondheims-Ørn finished third. At the end of the season, Hakadal, Nybergsund, Mathopen, Haugar, Fyllingen, Tolga and Namsos was relegated.

League tables

Group Østlandet

Group Vestlandet

Group Trøndelag

Championship play-off
Trondheims-Ørn – Nymark 1-1
Nymark – Asker 1-0
Asker – Trondheims/Ørn 2-1

References
Tables

Norwegian First Division (women) seasons
Top level Norwegian women's football league seasons
women
Nor
Nor